Maurice Podbrey CM (born April 25, 1934) is a South African actor and theatre director. He has spent much of his career in Canada, where he co-founded and was the artistic director of the English-language Centaur Theatre in Montreal.

Biography
Podbrey was born in Durban in 1934 into a Lithuanian Jewish family. His father had had Bundist sympathies and his politics influenced his children; Podbrey's sister Pauline later became a trade union organiser.

Podbrey was educated at the University of the Witwatersrand and at the College of Education; after graduating, he emigrated to England and worked as a schoolteacher. In 1959, he switched careers to work as an actor and director. He briefly served as the artistic director for the Chester Playhouse before moving again to Montreal in 1967, when he was invited to join the National Theatre School of Canada as an instructor. Seeking to remedy the lack of English-language theatre in Montreal, Podbrey and Herb Auerbach opened a theatre company in Montreal's former Montreal Stock Exchange building on François-Xavier St. in Old Montreal. Podbrey was the artistic director of the newly founded Centaur Theatre, with Auerbach acting as president and founding chairman.

Having seen and admired the work of South African playwright Athol Fugard in London, Podbrey introduced his work to the North American theatre scene by staging People Are Living There at the Centaur in 1975. Podbrey held his position as artistic director of the Centaur until his retirement in 1997, when he was succeeded by Gordon McCall. He then returned to South Africa and founded Mopo Cultural Trust, a non-profit devoted to developing South African theatre.

Podbrey was awarded membership of the Order of Canada on April 19, 1991, for his services to the performing arts in Canada.

Film and television performances

Bibliography
Charlebois, Gaetan. "Maurice Podbrey." Canadian Theatre Encyclopedia. N.p., 5 July 2013. Web.

Marsh, James H. "Centaur Theatre." The Canadian Encyclopedia: Year 2000 Edition. Toronto: McClelland & Stewart, 2000. 425-26. Print.

Podbrey, Maurice, and R. Bruce. Henry. Half Man, Half Beast: Making a Life in Canadian Theatre. Montréal: Véhicule Press, 1997. Print.

References

External links
 Interview with Theatre Museum Canada, 30 May 2007

1934 births
Living people
Canadian theatre directors
Canadian male stage actors
Canadian male television actors
Canadian people of South African descent
South African expatriates in Canada
Members of the Order of Canada
University of the Witwatersrand alumni